Mohammad Akbar is an Indian politician of the Indian National Congress. He is the current Cabinet Minister of Chhattisgarh. He is a member of the Chhattisgarh Legislative Assembly representing Kawardha.

References

Living people
Year of birth missing (living people)
Indian National Congress politicians from Chhattisgarh
Chhattisgarh MLAs 2018–2023